Angus Blyth (born 4 March 1998) is an Australian rugby union player who plays for the  in the Super Rugby competition. His position of choice is lock.

References 

Australian rugby union players
1998 births
Living people
Sportspeople from the Gold Coast, Queensland
Rugby union locks
Queensland Country (NRC team) players
Queensland Reds players